James Burgon Valentine (born October 5, 1978) is an American musician who is the lead guitarist and backing vocalist for the pop rock band Maroon 5.

Early life 
Valentine was born in Lincoln, Nebraska. He was raised as a member of the Church of Jesus Christ of Latter-day Saints (LDS Church) and has three sisters and one brother.  His mother is a former beauty queen, who was a school teacher before becoming a stay-at-home mom to raise her five children. His younger sister, Amanda Valentine, has been a contestant on Project Runway two times starring in Season 11 and Season 13, as well as Project Runway All Stars once in Season 6. James is an Eagle Scout.  He was the president of his high school Lincoln Southeast High School's student council in Lincoln, Nebraska. He graduated from the University of Nebraska–Lincoln and attended Berklee College of Music.

In addition to guitar, Valentine is also a percussionist, playing in orchestra and jazz band in his youth.

Career 
Valentine played in Lincoln bands: Montag, Kid Quarkstar, Mondello and Happy Dog. In 2000, Happy Dog changed its name to Square and he moved to Los Angeles from Anaheim, California, where he taught private guitar lessons out of his home.  Valentine had also played with Reel Big Fish, firstly when guitarist Aaron Barrett broke his hand and later in 2001, when Barrett fell down some stairs. Valentine displayed a picture from one Reel Big Fish show he played during Maroon 5's appearance on MTV Cribs. Eventually the members of Square and Kara's Flowers became friends and when Adam Levine, Jesse Carmichael, Mickey Madden and Ryan Dusick began looking for another guitarist, Valentine was approached. The band Kara's Flowers changed their name to Maroon. Personal tensions in Square helped the decision to join the band and shortly afterward, Kara's Flowers became Maroon 5.

Valentine is a friend of John Mayer, whom he met in 1996 at Berklee in Boston, Massachusetts. Valentine once tried to get Mayer to move to Lincoln to play guitar for the Lincoln blues rock band Baby Jason and the Spankers. An opening slot on Mayer's 2003 summer tour helped bring widespread exposure to Maroon 5. Valentine contributed guitar work to Mayer's September 2006 release Continuum on the songs "Stop This Train" and "In Repair."

Valentine also played guitar on Jenny Lewis' 2006 solo album, Rabbit Fur Coat with The Watson Twins and has appeared in her music video for the first single, "Rise Up with Fists!!".

Phases 

Phases (originally called JJAMZ) is a band composed of James Valentine (Maroon 5), Jason Boesel (Rilo Kiley/Conor Oberst), Alex Greenwald (Phantom Planet), Michael Runion (solo), and Z Berg (The Like). The group was started at karaoke night at Guys in Hollywood. The band name was an acronym using the first letter of each member's name. The group was means of escape from each member's respective bands. "[Phases] started at an interesting time in all of our lives. We all needed some kind of escape from relationships or our other bands. It was a tumultuous time, and the lyrics just came out. It was like word vomit. I can't remember." said Z Berg, lead vocalist for the Like. The band played their first concert at the Echo Plex on January 27, 2009. They released their debut album Suicide Pact on July 10, 2012. Later, Valentine left the band due to work with Maroon 5 and the band changed their name to Phases.

Discography 

Other albums, on which Valentine has played
 Jenny Lewis with The Watson Twins – Rabbit Fur Coat (2006)
 John Mayer – Continuum (2006) (guitar on "Stop This Train" and "In Repair")
 Rilo Kiley – Under the Blacklight (2007)
 Rachael Yamagata – Elephants...Teeth Sinking into Heart (2008) (guitar on "Pause the Tragic Ending")
 Operation Aloha – Operation Aloha (2009)
 Janek Gwizdala – The Space in Between (2010) (guitar on "Bethany")
 Transmissor – Nacional (2011) (guitar on "Traz O Sol Pro Meu Lado Da Rua")
 PJ Morton – Following On My Mind (EP) (2012) and New Orleans (2013) (guitar on "Heavy"; also featuring Adam Levine)
 JJAMZ – Suicide Pact (2012)
 The Yellow River Boys – Urinal St. Station (2013) (various guitar solos)
 Screaming Headless Torsos – Code Red (2014) (guitar on "Brooce Swayne")
 Mike Posner – At Night, Alone (2016) (guitar on "One Hell of a Song")
 KT Tunstall – Wax (2018) (backing vocals on "The River")
 Rihwa – Wild Inside (2018) (guitar on "Sun Comes Up")

References

External links 
 
Maroon 5's official website
BYU Daily Universe interview with Valentine's parents

1978 births
American rock guitarists
American male guitarists
Living people
Maroon 5 members
Berklee College of Music alumni
Musicians from Lincoln, Nebraska
University of Nebraska–Lincoln alumni
Guitarists from Nebraska
Phases (band) members